"Give It All You Got" is a song performed by American recording artist Ultra Naté featuring Chris Willis. Co-written by Andy Evans, Glenn Evans, Ultra Naté and Chris Willis, the song was released as the fourth and final single from Ultra Naté's fifth studio album Grime, Silk, & Thunder.

Track listing
Digital download
 "Give It All You Got" (original extended mix) – 7:09
 "Give It All You Got" (Bimbo Jones Extended Mix) – 8:16
 "Give It All You Got" (Soulcast Progressive Club Mix) – 7:34
 "Give It All You Got" (Matty's All U Got Soulpop Mix) – 8:40
 "Give It All You Got" (Nujax Souer Tordue Dub Mix) – 6:34
 "Give It All You Got" (Lost Daze Mix) – 6:57

Charts

See also
List of number-one dance singles of 2008 (U.S.)

References

2007 singles
Ultra Naté songs
Chris Willis songs
Songs written by Chris Willis
2007 songs
Tommy Boy Records singles